The Western Sydney Dry Rainforest and Moist Woodland is a dry rainforest found in small pockets in south-western Sydney, New South Wales, Australia. Mostly featuring sclerophyll vegetation, it is listed as critically endangered under Australia's national environment law, the Environment Protection and Biodiversity Conservation Act 1999 (EPBC Act) as more than 70 per cent of its original extent has been reduced as a result of clearing, logging, weed invasion and heavy grazing.

Geography
It is a dry, scrubby, vegetation community that is disjointed and is limited to the covered slopes and gully bottoms of the Cumberland Plain, where it is found in small parts in the natural areas of Picton, Camden, Grose Vale, Cattai, Campbelltown, Razorback, Abbotsbury (near Calmsley Hill City Farm), and as well to the north in Richmond, Parramatta, Ryde, Baulkham Hills, where it grades from a dry rainforest with a closed non-eucalypt canopy into moist woodland with an open canopy dominated by eucalypts. It is found in relatively higher rainfall areas compared to the areas on the western Sydney plain in precipitous and more rugged terrain. Only about 950 hectares remain, almost all of which occurring as highly disunited patches under 10 ha in size.

Ecology
The dry rainforest is a low, closed forest that mostly features non-eucalypts, such as Melaleuca styphelioides, Acacia implexa, Alectryon subcinereus and Melicope micrococca with an understory of various shrubs, and a mostly sparse cover of grasses, vine thickets, ferns and other herbs such as Alchornea ilicifolia. Plants that generally occur in other types of rainforest/moist woodland in New South Wales are usually nonexistent in this community, such as palms and mosses.

Shrubs include Notelaea longifolia, Spartothamnella juncea, Marsdenia viridiflora, Clerodendrum tomentosum and Pittosporum revolutum, with vines such as Aphanopetalum resinosum, Pandorea pandorana and Causonis clematidea.

Fauna
Fauna species include Mixophyes iteratus, Alectura lathami, Stagonopleura guttata, Acanthorhynchus tenuirostris and Anthochaera phrygia.

References

Biogeography of New South Wales
Endangered ecological communities
Geography of Sydney
Remnant urban bushland
Vegetation of Australia
Ecoregions of New South Wales
Temperate grasslands, savannas, and shrublands
Sclerophyll forests